Cornelius Sim  DD (16 September 1951 – 29 May 2021) was a Bruneian prelate of the Catholic Church who served as Vicar Apostolic of Brunei from 2004 until his death. He had previously served as the apostolic prefect of Brunei from 1997 to 2004.

Sim was the first graduate of Franciscan University of Steubenville priestly discernment program to be ordained to the priesthood. Pope Francis raised him to the rank of a cardinal on 28 November 2020, making him the first cardinal from the country, and from the island of Borneo. Sim has been credited as "Brunei's most famous Catholic" and a "towering figure" in the history of Bruneian Christianity.

Early life
Sim was born in Seria, Brunei, on 16 September 1951. He was the eldest of six children of Lawrence Sim and Monica Yeo, and his grandparents were the first Catholics in their village. He was of Chinese and Dusunic descent. He was raised a Catholic and educated in Catholic schools, but practised his faith less as he reached adulthood.

Sim earned an engineering degree from Dundee University in Scotland. After this he stopped practising his faith. He worked in utilities operations of Brunei LNG, a joint-venture between the  Bruneian government, Royal Dutch Shell and Mitsubishi, from 1978 to 1985; he spent some of these years working abroad. Returning to Brunei, he rediscovered his Catholic faith and grew close to a charismatic group that downplayed doctrine and emphasized personal relationships with God. He earned a master's degree in theology at the Franciscan University of Steubenville, Ohio, in 1988. He returned to Brunei in 1988 and served as an administrator in St John's Church, Kuala Belait until his ordination as deacon on 28 May 1989.

Presbyteral ministry
Sim was ordained to the priesthood on 26 November 1989. He became the country's first local priest. He served the faithful in Brunei alongside two other missionary priests resident in Brunei, until 1991. Following this, Sim served all parishes as the sole priest in Brunei for an indefinite period during which he pledged that there would be "no let up" in services to the faithful. He was appointed vicar general of Brunei in 1995, which was part of the Diocese of Miri in Malaysia at the time. After Brunei was split from Miri to form the Apostolic Prefecture of Brunei, Pope John Paul II named Sim apostolic prefect on 21 November 1997. He was installed there on 23 February the following year.

Sim attended the 1998 Asia Synod of Bishops and was observed as a "young prefect apostolic" at the time. Three years later in 2001, Sim also attended the ad limina visit to Pope John Paul II by prelates from the Bishops' Conference of Malaysia, Singapore and Brunei.

Episcopal ministry
Pope John Paul II elevated the Prefecture of Brunei to the status of a vicariate and appointed Sim the first Apostolic Vicar of Brunei and Titular Bishop of Putia in Numidia on 20 October 2004.

Bishop
He received his episcopal consecration on 21 January 2005 from Archbishop Salvatore Pennacchio at the Church of Our Lady of the Assumption in Bandar Seri Begawan. The co-consecrators were John Ha Tiong Hock, Archbishop of Kuching and Anthony Lee Kok Hin, Bishop of Miri. He requested that his ordination be held in Brunei rather than Rome, so that the local faithful could take part. On a number of occasions, Sim publicly advocated for peaceful and tolerant relations amongst Bruneians of all religious affiliations. He was also involved in the activities of schools operating under his authority, publicly attending functions such as Chinese New Year. Sim frequently acted as the representative of the Christian community in Brunei during government engagements locally and abroad, including with foreign diplomatic missions, local ministries and the supreme court. 

In June 2005, Sim welcomed the Holy See's foreign minister to Brunei, who during his visit met with Brunei's deputy sultan.

Sim made an ad limina visit on 5 June 2008 to the Apostolic Palace in the Vatican for an audience with Pope Benedict XVI.

On 15 July 2014, Sim backed calls made by Brunei's reigning sultan to the country to pray for peace in Palestine amid rising tensions. Sim urged Catholics to pray for peace, and also pledged the Catholic Church's support towards Brunei government aid initiatives.

On 8 Feb 2018, Sim made an ad limina visit to the Vatican for an audience with Pope Francis.

Sim celebrated his 10th episcopal anniversary and coincidentally his silver jubilee of ordination to the priesthood on 21 January 2015 with a commemorative Mass at the Church of Our Lady of the Assumption in Bandar Seri Begawan. The Mass was concelebrated with the other resident priests from Brunei, as well as several prelates and guest priests representing neighbouring dioceses from the  Philippines, Kota Kinabalu, Sandakan, Keningau and Singapore, as well as the Apostolic Delegation to Brunei Darussalam. In the following days, Sim and the visiting apostolic delegate attended an audience ceremony at one of the Brunei royal houses.

During the COVID-19 pandemic, Sim introduced livestreaming of Mass for the faithful to participate in a virtual capacity during lockdown measures.

Cardinal
On 25 October 2020, Pope Francis announced he would raise Sim to the rank of cardinal at a consistory scheduled for 28 November 2020. Sim accepted the appointment "for the good of  the Church and the peoples in the  region", saying it was "a good sign for the nation". Cardinal Charles Maung Bo sent public congratulations to Sim on behalf of the Federation of Asian Bishops' Conferences. Sim continued to credit his charismatic roots as the basis of his faith, allowing that the movement has been appropriately "domesticated, maybe for good reason". He did not attend the consistory in Rome because of travel restrictions related to the COVID-19 pandemic. He expected to receive the symbols of his new rank when the new Apostolic Delegate to Brunei, Archbishop Wojciech Załuski, could travel to take up his post. At that consistory, Pope Francis made him Cardinal-Priest of San Giuda Taddeo Apostolo. On 16 December 2020, he was named a member of the Congregation for the Clergy. His cardinal's red [biretta] and ring were couriered to Brunei at a later date after the consistory. In spite of a quietened coverage of his elevation as he did not attend the consistory, Sim still recognized his appointment to the cardinalate as being a sign of worldwide recognition of the nation's Christian community in general.

In March 2021, Sim joined with other Asian cardinals in calling for "peace and reconciliation" in Myanmar. During his final address to his congregation in May that year, Sim urged the People of God in Brunei not to "be spectators" in his absence, but to make visible their contributions of "time, talent and treasure."

Illness, death and legacy
Sim died on 29 May 2021 at Chang Gung Memorial Hospital (CGMH) in Taoyuan, Taiwan. He was 69, and suffered a cardiac arrest.  He had travelled to Taiwan for cancer treatment. His passing received coverage in local state-influenced news media and online forums, as well as Catholic outlets throughout the world.
Tributes were sent following his death from prelates in neighbouring dioceses in the Southeast Asian region, as well as from state dignitaries in Brunei. Speaking on Sim's death, the  Archbishop of Kuala Lumpur  Julian Leow said, "Brunei has lost one of her illustrious sons, the  Bishops’ Conference, a dear brother and the Church, a prince." Archbishop of Kota Kinabalu  John Wong said, “Cardinal Sim left an unforgettable mark in his untiring and devoted service to the Church, and for his constant advocacy of dialogue and peace for all people in Brunei." The  United States Embassy in Brunei expressed its "deep sadness" at the passing of the "charismatic leader" Cardinal Sim. 

On the day of Sim's passing, Pope Francis sent a telegram of condolence praising Sim's "generous service" to the Apostolic Vicariate of Brunei and to the Holy See, while also expressing his sadness in learning of the cardinal's death, and expressing solidarity with his family as well as the clergy and faithful of Brunei. The Apostolic Vicariate of Brunei suspended all church activities throughout the country except Masses for two weeks to observe a period of mourning for the late cardinal while his body was being returned to Brunei, from Taiwan.

A wake (ceremony) was held for the late cardinal at the Church of Our Lady of Assumption, the parish which housed his cathedra in Brunei’s capital, on 14 June 2021 as his body lay in state, enabling mourners to pay their respects. A requiem was held the next day, 15 June, at 9AM and his body was driven through Brunei to all other parishes for the congregations to pay their last respects, before being buried in Kuala Belait. Among those in attendance at the funeral service were members of the diplomatic corps in Brunei, as well as representatives from other Christian churches and prominent local community figures.

On September 5 2021, exactly 100 days following Sim's death, the Christian Institute for Theological Engagement (CHRISTE) announced the appointment of the first Cornelius Cardinal Sim Professor, the Rev. Deacon Prof. Dr. Sherman Kuek. The professorship's main mission is facilitating research on theological and interreligious dialogue. The date set for the official appointment was September 16 2021, corresponding to Sim's 70th birth anniversary. On All Souls' Day in November 2021, Pope Francis held a mass at the  Throne of Saint Peter in  St. Peter's Basilica in Vatican City for the repose of Sim's soul, as well as of all other cardinals and bishops who had passed on in the last year.

Sim was among the contributing theologians and bishops of a youth edition release of the New Testament intended for the young peoples of Asia, which was launched at the FABC general conference in Thailand on 21 October 2022.

Honours
 Cornelius Cardinal Sim Professorial Chair of Theology and Dialogue - The Christian Institute for Theological Engagement (CHRISTE) – (2021)

See also
Cardinals created by Pope Francis
Apostolic Vicariate of Brunei Darussalam
Catholic Church in Brunei
Ethnic Chinese in Brunei

References

External links

 
 Official website of the Apostolic Vicariate of Brunei Darussalam
 Catholic Hierarchy Profile of Apostolic Vicariate of Brunei Darussalam

1951 births
21st-century Roman Catholic bishops in Brunei
Bruneian cardinals
Bruneian people of Chinese descent
2021 deaths
Alumni of the University of Dundee
Franciscan University of Steubenville alumni
Sim
Cardinals created by Pope Francis